St John the Baptist's Church, Timberhill, Norwich is a Grade I listed parish church in the Church of England in Norwich.

History
The church is medieval dating from the 11th century. The tower collapsed in 1784 and was rebuilt in stone in 1877. The windows were replaced in the 1870s.

Organ
The church contains an organ which has been much modified during the 20th century. A specification of the organ can be found on the National Pipe Organ Register.

References

Sources

External links

 Information about the Ber Street ward in Norwich from British History Online (Francis Blomefield, 'City of Norwich, chapter 42: Berstreet ward', in An Essay Towards A Topographical History of the County of Norfolk: Volume 4, the History of the City and County of Norwich, Part II (London, 1806), pp. 120–145.)
 St John the Baptist, Timberhill at the A Church Near You website (Church of England)
 

John
Grade I listed buildings in Norfolk
Anglo-Catholic church buildings in Norfolk
Norwich